Anne van der Meiden (4 June 1929 – 3 June 2021) was a Dutch theologian, translator, and professor at Utrecht University. He translated the bible into Tweants dialect.

References

1929 births
2021 deaths
Dutch translators
Bible translators
Dutch theologians
Academic staff of Utrecht University
People from Enschede